Hope & Heroes  is a 501(c)(3) non-profit organization based at Columbia University Medical Center (CUMC) in New York City. Hope & Heroes supports the Division of Pediatric Hematology, Oncology & Stem Cell Transplantation at Columbia University Medical Center. Hope & Heroes funds work on childhood cancer and blood disorders at Columbia University Medical Center—including research, support for families, and care.

History

Though it was officially incorporated in 2002, the Hope & Heroes name dates back to 1997, when sportswriter Mike Lupica wrote  about the friendship between patient Beth Maria and Tino Martinez who was then a first baseman for the New York Yankees. The first article appeared on the front page of the New York Daily News on June 22, 1997, with the headline "Hope & Heroes". Michael Weiner, MD, Chief of the Division of Pediatric Oncology at CUMC, adopted the name as part of his efforts to attract funding for programs that needed philanthropic support.

Fundraising
The charity raises approximately $3.5 million per year to support the Division's prestigious clinical care, research and supporting programs. The full-time staff currently consists of an executive director, a senior director of development, and an events and outreach manager. The funds are raised through a multitude of events, annual giving and multi-year gift agreements with major donors. Events include a golf tournament, a gala dinner, a walk and a luncheon, along with community and family run functions throughout the tri-state area.

Services
The Herbert Irving Child & Adolescent Oncology Center has three pillars of care for children with cancer—Leukemia/Lymphoma, Solid tumors and Neurooncology (Brain Tumors). Each of these three endeavors consists of a basic science research component and a clinical component. The clinical component is further divided into two areas: clinical investigation and patient care. This overall structure of laboratory investigation linked with a clinical enterprise has been established in order to translate the laboratory findings into improved treatments for children with cancer.

The research component of the Leukemia/Lymphoma program consists of the laboratory of Dr. Adolfo Ferrando and his colleagues Drs. Maria Luisa Sulis and Teresa Palomero. In January 2005, the recruitment of Dr. Ferrando from Harvard University and the Dana Farber Cancer Institute was made possible, in part, by prior commitments of the Wipe Out Leukemia Forever Foundation and a grateful patient family. The Leukemia/Lymphoma program currently has a highly developed and successful laboratory component and currently performs clinical research through our membership in the Dana Farber Cancer Institute Consortium and the Children's Oncology Group.

Solid tumors are investigated in the Tay-bandz research laboratory under the direction of Dr. Darrell Yamashiro. Clinically, the novel initiatives discovered in Yamashiro's laboratory have allowed the establishment of the Pediatric Cancer Foundation Developmental Therapeutics program, under the direction of Dr. Julia Glade-Bender. An example of this bench-to-bedside initiative has been the laboratory's work in anti-angiogenesis and a national study using treatment with the anti-vascular endothelial growth factor, Avastin. The Pediatric Cancer Foundation Research gift has allowed the hiring of a research nurse practitioner and an administrative coordinator to assist Dr. Bender.

With respect to Neuro-Oncology (Brain Tumors), the basic laboratory research is being conducted by Drs. Antonio Iavarrone, Anna Lasorella, and Saadi Ghatan. The clinical portion of the brain tumor enterprise, the Alfano Family Foundation Neuro-oncology program, is led by Dr. James Garvin. Working with Garvin is a full-time clinical research nurse and an administrative coordinator/assistant. Together as a team, they are conducting clinical research and providing patient care.

Four Supporting Programs
The Herbert Irving Child & Adolescent Oncology Center has four overarching clinic-wide programs that support its three pillars of care. They are Integrative Therapies, Psycho-Social/Child Life, Developmental Therapeutics and the Center for Survivor Wellness Each program combines a clinical care component with research.

The Integrative Therapies Program for Children with Cancer was the first program of its kind to mainstream complementary medicine into a conventional program of surgery, radiation and chemotherapy.  The mission is to disseminate reputable information on complementary therapies; to lessen the side effects of conventional treatments; to perform clinical research; and to evaluate the safety and potential interactions of complementary therapies with conventional treatments for childhood cancer. Services provided at no cost to patients include acupressure, acupuncture, aromatherapy, chef program, massage therapy, Reiki, nutritional and herbal counseling and yoga instruction.  This program is 100% supported by philanthropic donations.

The Valerie Fund Psychosocial Program includes a child psychologist, child-life specialists, social workers, and clergy. This is the only program in New York City that receives support from the New Jersey-based Valerie Fund. The team provides counseling, therapeutic play, pet therapy, music therapy, pastoral care, and the "Big Apple Circus Clown" program. Individual and age-appropriate group therapy is available to patients, families, and siblings. Child life therapists use play, art projects and other activities to help children learn about and gain skills for coping with upcoming procedures and to work through any fears that may arise.

Developmental Therapeutics is a new initiative made possible by a gift by the Pediatric Cancer Foundation. It includes basic research to define novel therapeutic targets, translational research to adapt observations from the laboratory to patients and clinical research to examine the behavior of novel therapeutics. Drs. Julia Glade Bender, Darrell Yamashiro and Alice Lee will collaborate to research new agents and bring them to clinical trial.

The Center for Survivor Wellness is a newly created program made possible by funding from the Joseph LeRoy and Ann C. Warner Fund, Inc. The program is a joint clinical collaboration between pediatric and medical oncology. Its goal is to diminish the long-term effects of cancer treatment, including second malignancies, and to introduce healthy lifestyle changes to patients who have survived cancer. The program is led by Jennifer Levine, MD and staffed by a collaborative roster of current Columbia University pediatric and medical oncology physicians as well as a nurse practitioner and a clinical coordinator.

References

Non-profit organizations based in New York City
Cancer charities in the United States
Organizations established in 2002
2002 establishments in New York City
Charities based in New York City
Medical and health organizations based in New York (state)